The Butterosi was a French automobile manufactured between 1919 and 1924 in Boulogne-sur-Seine, just  west of central Paris,

The car featured a side-valve four-cylinder engine of 1327cc (12 HP) and sat on a  wheelbase.  Three different body styles were offered - a two-seater roadster, a tourer and a closed saloon.

The Butterosi was not held in universally high regard: in his book French Vintage Cars, John Bolster writes "Some people think all vintage cars are good, which only proves that they have never owned a Butterosi!".

In addition to assembling its own 12 HP model, Ponderosi was the French importer for American Mitchell cars from Wisconsin.

References

External links
 1919 English advertising poster
 1920 English advertising brochure

Defunct motor vehicle manufacturers of France
Vehicle manufacturing companies established in 1919
Vehicle manufacturing companies disestablished in 1924
1919 establishments in France
1924 disestablishments in France